A ministry of labour (UK), or labor (US), also known as a department of labour, or labor, is a government department responsible for setting labour standards, labour dispute mechanisms, employment, workforce participation, training, and social security. Such a department may have national or regional (e.g. provincial or state-level) authority.

Lists of current ministries of labour

Named "ministry" 
 Ministry of Labour and Social Affairs (Albania)
 Ministry of Labour, Employment and Social Security (Argentina)
 Department of Jobs and Small Business (Australia)
 Ministry of Labour and Social Protection of the Population (Azerbaijan)
 Ministry of Labour and Employment (Bangladesh)
 Ministry of Labour (Barbados)
 Ministry of Labour and Human Resources (Bhutan)
 Ministry of Work, Employment, and Social Security (Bolivia)
 Ministry of Labour and Vocational Training (Cambodia)
 Ministry of Human Resources and Social Security (China)
 Ministry of Labour (Colombia)
 Ministry of Labour and Pension System (Croatia)
 Ministry of Labour and Social Security (Cuba)
 Ministry of Labour and Social Affairs (Czech Republic)
 Ministry of Employment (Denmark)
 Ministry of Manpower and Immigration (Egypt)
 Ministry of Health, Labour and Social Affairs of Georgia
 Federal Ministry of Labour and Social Affairs (Germany)
 Ministry of Employment and Labour Relations (Ghana)
 Ministry of Labour, Social Insurance and Social Solidarity (Greece)
 Ministry of Labour and Employment (India)
 Ministry of Manpower (Indonesia)
 Ministry of Cooperatives, Labour, and Social Welfare (Iran)
 Ministry of Social Affairs and Social Services (Israel)
 Ministry of Labour and Social Policies (Italy)
 Ministry of Labour and Social Security (Jamaica)
 Ministry of Health, Labour and Welfare (Japan)
 Ministry of Employment and Labor (South Korea)
 Ministry of Social Security and Labour (Lithuania)
 Ministry of Human Resources (Malaysia)
 Ministry of Health, Labour and Social Protection (Moldova)
 Ministry of Labour (Myanmar)
 Ministry of Labour, Employment and Social Security (Nepal)
 Ministry of Social Affairs and Employment (Netherlands)
 Ministry of Business, Innovation and Employment (New Zealand)
 Federal Ministry of Labour and Productivity (Nigeria)
 Ministry of Labour (Norway)
 Ministry of Labour (Ontario)
 Ministry of Labour (Pakistan)
 Ministry of Labor and Promotion of Employment (Peru)
 Ministry of Family, Labour and Social Policy (Poland)
 Ministry of Labour, Solidarity and Social Security (Portugal)
 Ministry of Employment and Social Solidarity (Quebec)
 Rivers State Ministry of Employment Generation and Empowerment
 Ministry of Labor and Social Justice (Romania)
 Ministry of Labour and Social Affairs (Russia)
 Ministry of Labour, Employment, Veteran and Social Policy (Serbia)
 Ministry of Manpower (Singapore)
 Ministry of Employment, Social and Family Affairs (Somaliland)
 Ministry of Labour, Public Service and Human Resource Development (South Sudan)
 Ministry of Labour (Spain)
 Ministry of Labour, Trade Union Relations and Sabaragamuwa Development (Sri Lanka)
 Ministry of Employment (Sweden)
 Ministry of Labor (Taiwan)
 Ministry of Labour and Employment (Tanzania)
 Ministry of Labour (Thailand)
 Ministry of Labour and Social Security (Turkey)
 Ministry of Gender, Labour and Social Development (Uganda)
 Ministry of Social Policy of Ukraine
 Ministry of Labor and Social Protection of Population (Uzbekistan)
 Ministry of Labour, Invalids and Social Affairs (Vietnam)
 Ministry of Labour and Social Security (Zambia)
 Ministry of Public Service, Labour and Social Welfare (Zimbabwe)

Named "Department" 
 Department of Labour (Australia)
 Department of Labour and Employment (Haryana)
 Department of Labour (New Brunswick)
 Department of Labor and Employment (Philippines)
 Department of Labour (South Africa)
 Department of Labour and Employment (Tamil Nadu)
 Department for Work and Pensions (United Kingdom)
 United States Department of Labor
 Alaska Department of Labor and Workforce Development
 Colorado Department of Labor and Employment
 California Labor and Workforce Development Agency
 Georgia Department of Labor
 Idaho Department of Labor
 Illinois Department of Labor
 Kansas Department of Labor
 Maryland Department of Labor
 Michigan Department of Labor and Economic Opportunity
 Minnesota Department of Labor and Industry
 New Hampshire Department of Labor
 New Jersey Department of Labor and Workforce Development
 New York State Department of Labor
 North Dakota Department of Labor and Human Rights
 Oklahoma Department of Labor
 Pennsylvania Department of Labor and Industry
 Puerto Rico Department of Labor and Human Resources
 South Carolina Department of Labor
 Washington State Department of Labor and Industries

Other names
 Federal Public Service Employment (Belgium)
 Employment and Social Development Canada
 Labour and Welfare Bureau (Hong Kong)
 Secretariat of Labor and Social Welfare (Mexico)
 Oregon Bureau of Labor and Industries

Historical

Named "Ministry"
 Ministry of Social Protection (Colombia)
 Federal Ministry for Economics and Labour (Germany)
 Ministry of Labour and Social Affairs (Iran)
 Ministry of Labour and Sports (Norway)
 Ministry of Labour (Quebec)
 Ministry of Manpower and Income Security (Quebec)
 Ministry of Labour (United Kingdom)

Named "Department"
 Department of Education, Employment and Workplace Relations (Australia)
 Department of Employment (Australia)
 Department of Employment, Workplace Relations and Small Business (Australia)
 Department of Employment and Workplace Relations (Australia)
 Department of Labor and Immigration (Australia)
 Department of Labour and National Service (Australia)
 Department of Workplace Relations and Small Business (Australia)
 Department of Labour (Ireland) (title from 1966 to 1993; see now Department of Enterprise, Trade and Employment)
 Department of Labour (New Zealand)

Other names 
 Human Resources Development Canada

See also
 Minister of Labour

 
Labor